Solanocrinus thiollieri is an extinct species of crinoids from Jura, France. Like other feather stars, Solanocrinus did not have a stem and was not attached to the ocean floor. Instead, it possessed 22 prehensile tendrils, called "cirri," which it used to grab onto rocks.

References 

Prehistoric crinoid genera
Jurassic crinoids
Cretaceous crinoids
Fossils of France
Late Jurassic genus first appearances
Cretaceous genus extinctions